Metaphor is a London-based global design firm. Established in 2000 by Stephen Greenberg and Rachel Morris, Metaphor specializes in the re-presentation of museums, palaces, forts, landscapes, and country houses through master planning and design.     

Over the last 50 years, as museology has developed, museum professionals have become more aware of the uses of design in making museum exhibits. Metaphor’s directors, who got their start in architecture and novel writing, have developed new ways of seeing museums, breaking down the differences between exhibit and non-exhibit spaces, and emphasizing atmosphere, story-lines, and theater. Metaphor also takes a holistic view of museums, looking at everything from the big vision to the map in the visitors’ hands.

Museums

V & A

Metaphor's work in museums began with the master plan of the V & A in 2000. Future Plan delivered a phased 10-year plan, looking at all aspects of visitor experience, events, branding, retail, and other revenue. Since the design, these plans have been implemented in some stages. Metaphor has completed a further 25 projects supporting the rolling out of Future Plan.

Grand Egyptian Museum

Metaphor was the master planner and lead designer on the Grand Egyptian Museum in Giza, Cairo, from 2003 and 2011. It is one of the largest museums planned anywhere in the world.

Ashmolean Museum

Metaphor redesigned 32 permanent galleries at the Ashmolean Museum in Oxford, opening in 2009. 

Richard Dorment, from The Telegraph, said, "The galleries are quirky and unpredictable, full of nooks and crannies and yet completely navigable even to the dyspraxically challenged, like me.  That’s as much to do with the layout by the exhibition designers Metaphor as with the architecture".
Jonathan Glancey wrote in The Guardian that "in this enchanting museum . . . the contents of each gallery can be glimpsed from the one before, through openings and windows. So you get pulled along. And, wherever you walk, on whatever crisscrossing floor or bridge, you will be lured into ever more galleries, each presenting more of the Ashmolean’s rich collection…".

The Museum of the Order of St John

In 2010, Metaphor planned, renovated, and displayed the Museum of the Order of St John in Clerkenwell. It tells the story of the Knights of the Order of St John, the Crusades, and their later history.

Holburne Museum

The Holburne Museum in Bath reopened in 2011, after a complete re-design. Metaphor displayed the central collection as if reflecting the mind of its eccentric 18th-century collector.

Olympic Museum

In 2013, Metaphor redesigned the Olympic Museum in Lausanne, a museum of the renewal of the Olympics by Pierre de Coubertin and the Olympic Legacy. It also designed and curated the Parc Olympique, including new routes, sight lines, welcome sequences, and lighting.

Current Projects

Metaphor is currently master-planning the National Museum of Scotland and the National Railway Museum. It's also master-planning and re-designing Shakespeare's Globe.

Exhibitions

V & A

In 2007, Metaphor designed the Surreal Things exhibition at the V & A/ Stephen Bayley, writing for The Observer, called it "comprehensive, fascinating, engaging and instructive". [Rachel Campbell-Johnston], writing for The Times, said 'the psychological mood starts to possess you'.

The exhibition was redesigned to appear at the Guggenheim Museum Bilbao, running from 2007 to 2008. It was seen by 575,000 visitors, making it the most successful V & A touring exhibition ever.

British Museum

Metaphor first worked at the British Museum when it designed the exhibition on Michelangelo in 2005. At the time, it broke the museum's audience records, with 160,000 people seeing it.

The First Emperor: China’s Terracotta Warriors at the British Museum in London, was a critical and commercial success. Metaphor used the curved walls of the Round Reading Room to hold projections, acting as a theatrical backdrop. Rachel Campbell-Johnston said that "exhibition designers and curators have to work hard to create a sense of spectacle. But they succeed brilliantly. The museum’s great Round Reading Room has been temporarily adapted into an atmospheric show space".  
The exhibition was seen by 850,000 people, 37% of whom had never been to the British Museum before.

Heritage

Metaphor has undertaken many projects in the wider cultural and heritage sector, including with National Trust properties, Historic Royal Palaces, and Wordsworth Trust. Clients have included Hampton Court Palace, Fountains Abbey, Wordsworth Trust, Hardwick Hall Country Park, Coughton Court, Winchester Cathedral, Winchester College, and Tyntesfield.

Lectures and writing

Metaphor's director, Stephen Greenberg, constantly lectures and teaches at universities around the country, including the University of Nottingham, the University of Leicester, and the University of Cambridge. He has also lectured at numerous museum conferences around the world. 

Metaphor's director Rachel Morris has spoken at a number of conferences, such as, the Museums Association Conference in Cardiff in 2014, entitled 'The Collection in the Cloud' on virtual museums and the concept of a museum space.

Metaphor curates a website called The Museum of Marco Polo, which seeks to explore 'What is a Museum?' and the changing relationship between the physical museum space and the virtual visitor. It includes the History of the Museum, and an explanation of how The Museum of Marco Polo came to be located on the island of Büyükada, near Istanbul. It is illustrated by the award-winning graphic novelist Isabel Greenberg.

References 
Footnotes

Notes

External links 
 

Design companies of the United Kingdom